Malephora crocea is a species of flowering plant in the ice plant family known by the common name coppery mesemb and red ice plant. It is native to Africa and it is grown in many other places as an ornamental plant and a groundcover. In California and Baja California this is an introduced species and often a noxious weed in coastal habitat such as beaches and bluffs. It is planted along highways in California and in Arizona it is utilized in landscaping for its low water needs and tolerance of sun. It has been recommended as a groundcover in areas prone to wildfire in southern California due to its low flammability.

This is a perennial herb with a creeping corky to woody stem which roots where nodes come in contact with soil. The succulent leaves are triangular in cross-section, a few centimeters long, pale green to reddish in color, and somewhat waxy in texture. The flower is borne on a short stalk. It has many narrow petals in shades of red, orange, and yellow, sometimes with purplish undersides. The fruit is a valved capsule containing many lens-shaped seeds.

References

External links
Jepson Manual Treatment
USDA Plants Profile
Photo gallery

Aizoaceae
Flora of Southern Africa
Groundcovers